Shenzhen University station, was the terminus of Shenzhen Metro Line 1 until 15 June 2011. It opened on 28 September 2009. It is located underneath Kejinnan Yilu, west of the intersection of Shennan Blvd and Keyuan Road S., Nanshan District, Shenzhen, China. The station is named after Shenzhen University, but its name has been criticised since it is actually near Shenzhen High-Tech Park.

Station layout

Exits

References

External links
 Shenzhen Metro Shenzhen University Station (Chinese)
 Shenzhen Metro Shenzhen University Station (English)

Railway stations in Guangdong
Shenzhen Metro stations
Nanshan District, Shenzhen
Railway stations in China opened in 2009
Railway stations in China at university and college campuses